iBall is an Indian electronics retailer headquartered in Mumbai. It imports computer peripherals, smartphones and tablets from original equipment manufacturers (OEMs).

Products
, the company sold consumer electronics products in 27 different product categories.
In 2014, iBall launched the Andi Uddaan smartphone for women. An SOS button located at the back of the phone sounds a loud siren and automatically sends text messages (SMS) to five pre-selected contacts when pressed.

In May 2015, iBall launched the iBall Slide i701 in collaboration with Intel and Microsoft.

In May 2016, iBall entered into a strategic partnership with Intel and Microsoft claimed to have launched India's most affordable Windows 10 Laptop - iBall CompBook at ₹9,999.

Awards 
In 2020, iBall won the MEA Award for Innovative Use of Ambient Media.

References

External links

2001 establishments in Maharashtra
Indian companies established in 2001
Computer peripheral companies
Electronics companies of India
Mobile phone manufacturers
Mobile phone companies of India
Companies based in Mumbai
Headphones manufacturers
Microphone manufacturers
Loudspeaker manufacturers
Display technology companies
Portable audio player manufacturers
Computer hardware companies
Computer companies of India
Audio equipment manufacturers of India
Consumer electronics retailers